Hybotinae is a globally widespread subfamily of hybotid flies.

Genera
 Acarterus  Loew, 1858
 Afrohybos Smith, 1967
 Ceratohybos  Bezzi 
 Chillcottomyia Saigusa, 1986
 Euhybus  Coquillett, 1895 
 Hybos Meigen, 1803
 Lactistomyia Melander, 1902
 Lamachella Melander, 1928
 Neohybos Ale-Rocha & Carvalho, 2003 
 Parahybos  Kertész, 1899
 Smithybos Ale-Rocha, 2000
 Stenoproctus Loew, 1858
 Syndyas Loew, 1857  
 Syneches Walker, 1852

References

Hybotidae
Brachycera subfamilies